A subsoiler or flat lifter is a tractor-mounted farm implement used for deep tillage, loosening and breaking up soil at depths below the levels worked by moldboard ploughs, disc harrows, or rototillers.

The subsoiler is a tillage tool which will improve growth in all crops where soil compaction is a problem. In agriculture angled wings are used to lift and shatter the hardpan that builds up due to compaction. The design provides deep tillage, loosening soil deeper than a tiller or plough is capable of reaching. Agricultural subsoilers, according to the Unverferth Company, can disrupt hardpan ground down to  depths.

The subsoiler consists of three or more heavy vertical shanks (standards) mounted on a toolbar or frame with shear bolts. Shanks are curved and have replaceable tips. Subsoiling is a slow operation and requires high power input:  to pull a single subsoil point through a hard soil. The shanks should be inclined to the vertical at an angle greater than 25-30 degrees, preferably 45 degrees, and it is advisable that the height be adjustable. The condition of the points is very important: often the subsoiler fails to give good results due to the condition of its points. These plows are sometimes equipped with a torpedo-shaped attachment for making subsurface drainage channels. The subsoilers are raised and lowered hydraulically. Some models feature power-take-off (PTO)-driven vibrating devices. Shank spacing and height should be adjustable in the field. Towed subsoilers should have gauge wheels to control the shank's depth.

Thinner shanks are suited for agricultural use. Thicker shanks hold up better in rocky conditions, but require larger, more powerful equipment to pull them and disturb the surface more.

Various manufacturers' brochures claim that crops perform well during hot and dry seasons because roots penetrate soil layers deeper to reach moisture and nutrients. Brochures further claim that in wet conditions, the water passes more easily through the shattered areas, reducing the possibility of crops drowning.

Agricultural subsoiler implements will have multiple deeper-reaching blades; each blade is called a scarifier or shank. Purdue University's Department of Agriculture indicates that common subsoilers for agricultural use are available with three, five or seven shanks.

One type of subsoiler has a torpedo-shaped tip and is called a mole plough because the tip describes a path much like the burrow that a mole creates. Mole ploughs are used to create tile drainage, with or without tiles or tile line added. A form of this implement (with a single blade), a pipe-and-cable-laying plough, is used to lay buried cables or pipes, without the need to dig a deep trench and re-fill it.

See also 
 Plough - Chisel plough
 Bulldozer ripper
 List of agricultural machinery

References 

Agricultural machinery